HMS Pioneer was a Pigmy–class schooner of the Royal Navy, launched in 1810 as a cutter. During her service with the Navy she captured one French privateer and assisted at the capture of another. In 1823–1824 she underwent fitting for the Coast Guard blockade. She then served with the Coast Guard to 1845. She was sold at Plymouth in 1849.

Royal Navy
Lieutenant John Row Morris commissioned Pioneer in May 1810.

Between October and November 1811, Pioneer was at Sheerness, being converted to a schooner. However, mentions of her in the press alternated between "cutter" and "schooner", and occasionally, "sloop".

On 21 March 1812 Pioneer chased three smuggling gallies ashore between Deal and Walmer Castle. She was able to seize one, together with the spirits the galley was carrying. Small arms fire by persons on shore hit Pioneers boat and prevented Pioneer from capturing either of the other two . The Commissioners of His Majesty's Customs offered a reward of £200 for information leading to the capture and conviction of the men who had fired the shots.

On 10 May Pioneer and  captured the French privateer lugger Infatigable. She was six hours out of Boulogne and had made no captures. Of her crew of 29 men her captain was killed and 9 men were wounded before she struck.

Bon Genie was pierced for 16 guns but only had four mounted. She had a crew of 60 men, and did not strike until she had lost three men killed and 16 wounded, most severely. She had left Boulogne the previous day and had not captured anything.

On 30 December 1812 a French privateer captured Riga Merchant, of Sunderland, off Farleigh. The "Pioneer cutter" recaptured Riga Merchant the same day and sent her into Dover. His Majesty's   was in company.

On 7 September 1813 Decoy and Pioneer recaptured the English brig William.

On 15 June 1814 Morris was promoted to commander.

In June Lieutenant John Hill replaced Morris.

On 9 January 1815 the schooner Pioneer arrived at Falmouth, Cornwall. She had left Newfoundland 16 days earlier with a fleet, but had parted from the fleet in a gale that had forced her to throw  of her guns overboard. Then on 6 January a United States sloop-of-war or large privateer had chased her.

On 11 May the "Pioneer cutter" arrived at the Downs from the Scheldt. Pioneer was accompanied by a large schooner laden with gunpowder that Pioneer had detained.

In April 1815 Lieutenant John Wood Rouse replaced Hill.

On 24 May 1817 Pioneer seized the boat Blossom, and the spirits she was carrying.

On 1 June 1818 Pioneer, Lieutenant Rouse, captured the smuggling vessel De Wasp.

In December 1818 Lieutenant William Oldrey replaced Rouse. Pioneer was reconverted to a cutter in 1819. Between March 1819 and June 1820, Pioneer, Lieutenant Oldroy, made several seizures of smuggled goods.

On 5 May 1822 Pioneer towed into Hull Blessing, Robinson, master. Blessing had been on her way from Shields to London when Blessing ran on shore near Cromer and damaged her rudder.

Coast Guard and fate
Between January 1823 and April 1824 Pioneer was at Plymouth being fitted for the Coast Blockade. She then served the Coast Guard to 1845. She was sold at Plymouth on 4 September 1849.

Notes

Citations

References
 
 
 

1810 ships
Cutters of the Royal Navy
Schooners of the Royal Navy